Cedar River may refer to:

Canada
 Cedar River (Ontario), a tributary of the English River

United States
 Cedar River (Iowa River tributary), in Minnesota and Iowa, a tributary of the Iowa River
 Cedar River (Antrim County, Michigan)
 Cedar River (Gladwin County, Michigan)
 Cedar River (Menominee County, Michigan)
 Cedar River (New York), a tributary of the Hudson River
 Cedar River (Washington), a tributary of Lake Washington
 Cedar River (Willapa Bay), Washington
 Cedar Creek (North Dakota), also known as Cedar River

See also 
 Cedar (disambiguation)
 Cedar Creek (disambiguation)
 Little Cedar River (disambiguation)
 Red Cedar River (disambiguation)